Brando Franco Windah (born 14 March 1992), professionally known as Windah Basudara or simply as Brando, is a Indonesian former actor, YouTuber and online streamer, best known for his video game live streaming on YouTube. He is also known for coining numerous terms, one of which is "Bocil Kematian" (lit. children of death), a term he used to describe his viewers. As of February 2023, he has 9,72 million subscribers.

On 8 June 2021, RRQ announced on their Instagram account (@teamrrq), that Windah Basudara was its new brand ambassador.

In 15 July 2022, his main YouTube channel was allegedly hacked and eventually deleted on 16 July 2022. His channel is back in the recovery process on 19 July 2022.

Early life
Brando Franco Windah was born on 14 March 1992 in Manado, North Sulawesi, he is the second child of 4 siblings. He has two sisters, Florence and Caroline, and a younger brother, Vincent. When he was still in kindergarten, his family decided to move and settle in Jakarta where he spent his formative years. He attended SD Santo Vincentius elementary, SMP Marsudirini junior high and SMA Santo Bellarminus high school.

When Brando was in the eleventh grade, he was frequently bullied by his classmates, eventually leading him to quit school and work for his father as an internet café operator. His parents convinced him to continue his education to graduate with a diploma, so he later applied for a homeschooling program run by Kak Seto, an Indonesian Psychologist.

After graduating from high school, Brando went to college where he studied International relations for a Bachelor's degree (Strata-1 in Indonesian academic standard) at The London School of Public Relations (LSPR), but he had to drop out due to economic constraints.

After quitting college, Brando began his working life as a waiter in a small café in Jakarta, where he earned around IDR 900,000 per month. He quit after only a month due to the low wage. Soon after, Brando started work at the Bluegrass restaurant in Kuningan, South Jakarta, where he was trained to be more professional, so his communication skills improved rapidly.

After three months at the Bluegrass, hotel officials from The Westin Jakarta Hotel visited the restaurant and Brando received an offer of work at the new five-star hotel due to open in the Gama Tower. Having decided to accept the offer, Brando quit his job at the restaurant. Because it was several months before The Westin Jakarta would open, he was unable to start immediately, so in the meantime, Brando had to find work in another restaurant.

Once working at the hotel, Brando earned a salary of around IDR 10,000,000. After approximately two and a half years working in the five-star hotel, Brando felt he was being passed over for promotion and decided that he did not want to remain in the same position any longer, so he resigned. He met his girlfriend Sesilia Agnes while still working at the hotel.

Brando decided working at a hotel was not where he wanted to be, he saw his future as a professional YouTuber, particularly in the gaming category.

Personal life
When Brando was in his freshman year in middle school, he experienced bullying by his schoolmates, this could have been due to his tall, lanky stature. He did not tell his parents because he felt ashamed to admit that others saw him this way. The bullying continued into high school which is why he decided to quit in second grade.

Career

Brando had been fond of playing video games since childhood. The first console he played on was a Nintendo NES. Since beginning elementary school, Brando was fond of his PlayStation 1 (PSX) and the RPG game Suikoden II.

Brando's interest in gaming continued into adulthood, although at that time he was working as a waiter in a five-star hotel. After he saw the success of YouTubers like MiawAug, he felt he had the potential to become a professional Gaming YouTuber and decided to resign from the hotel. To begin his new career, he bought an Asus ROG laptop for IDR 13,000,000, but he was still nervous about starting his own channel, so he planned to invite two of his siblings, Caroline and Vincent, so each could start their own channel at the same time. However, because they were still at school, he had no choice but to build a channel by himself. He created the channel Windah Basudara, taken from the family name, Windah and Basudara, which means 'brothers' in Manado language.

To kick-off his YouTuber career, the laptop which Brando had paid Rp. 13 million for a month earlier was damaged, so it had to be taken in for repair. Now desperate, he tried a return to hotel work, but each application was rejected. Brando confided in his mother, who offered him a loan so he could buy a new PC. He revealed that once he had difficulties getting viewers, so he began adding spam links in chats on several social media platforms such as Facebook, Google+ and Line Square.

YouTube career
Windah Basudara started his YouTube career on 29 Dec 2018. He reviews many genres of games on his YouTube channel. From Role Playing Games (RPG), Action, Real Time Strategy (RTS), Racing games, Adventure games, and many more. He is also known for the acting he usually performs during or at the end of his live streams, as part of his unique persona. He said that the performance is a form of gimmick to entertain and hopefully attract more viewers. He also said that he spent millions on costumes and miscellaneous items.

Due to his massive success as a streamer, he now amasses around 100k viewers during his live streams. In April 2019, Windah Basudara only had a thousand subscribers, in June 2019, his subscribers increased to 100,000. He has collaborated with MiawAug in the game Secret Neighbor and was also invited to appear on stage at the 2019 YouTube FanFest event. By June 2020 he had reached one million subscribers.

On 8 July 2021, Windah Basudara was officially announced, via their Instagram account (@teamrrq), as the new brand ambassador for the RRQ e-Sport team.

In addition to his YouTube success, Brando has also contributed to fundraising events. One of the most memorable was a 24 hour livestream, where he managed to collect funds of IDR 50 million which he donated towards helping to deal with COVID-19.

Nominations and awards

On 18 November 2021 at 18.30 GMT+7, GTV presented the Indonesian Esports Awards 2021. The Awards honoured the best Indonesian Esport players and Youtubers by Awarding the nominees based on the results of a public vote. The Indonesian Esports Awards 2021 was conducted by means of an online survey, due to spread of the coronavirus. Voting was held from 20 October to 18 November 2021. Windah Basudara managed to amass the most votes to win the Most Favorite Gaming Content Creator of 2021, despite tough competition in the other four nominees: Dyland Pros, Jess No Limit, Jonathan Liandi and Oura Gaming.

The Dunia Games Awards 2021 was held 23–24 December 2021 and presented by Dunia Games and Telkomsel. The awards announcement was made virtually through MAXstream, as well as Dunia Games and Telkomsel's YouTube channels. There were 17 categories and winners in DGA 2021. Those categories were presented for gamers, professional esports athletes, content creators, esports organisers, local game publishers and developers, celebrity gamers, and esports fan clubs. The winner of the 2021 Dunia Games Award was determined by public vote held from 1–14 December 2021. Windah Basudara won the award for Gaming Content Creator of the Year.

Notes

References

External links
 
 
 

Living people
Indonesian Internet celebrities
Indonesian YouTubers
Minahasa people
People from Manado
People from Jakarta
1992 births